Sky was an American rock power trio active in the early 1970s, based in Detroit, Michigan. It released two albums with RCA (Don't Hold Back in 1970 and Sailor's Delight in 1971) before breaking up in 1973. It's mostly known today as an early point in musician Doug Fieger's career, later the frontman of The Knack.

History
The group started out as their members finished high school in the Detroit area. It consisted of Doug Fieger (bass, lead vocals), John Coury (guitar, backing vocals, keyboards), and Rob Stawinski (drums, backing vocals). Sky gained a local following after serving as an opening act for popular groups such as Jethro Tull, The Who, Joe Cocker, Bob Seger, and The Stooges. It also played with Traffic numerous times. The group put out two albums on RCA, 1970's Don't Hold Back and 1971's Sailor's Delight (both produced in England by the Rolling Stones' producer, Jimmy Miller) and the low charting single "Goodie Two Shoes" which they performed on American Bandstand on February 27, 1971. Their sound was american rock along the lines of The Grateful Dead's then current phase mixed with harmony and hard rock influences. Traffic also strongly influenced their style.
Sky composed and performed the soundtrack music for Roger Cormans Private Duty Nurses in 1971 (never issued as an album), and appeared in the film as Sky, the band playing at Schlumpfelder's Bar.

Sky broke up shortly after their second album's release. The band is mostly remembered today for launching the career of musician Doug Fieger, who would later move to Los Angeles and start the seminal power pop/new wave group The Knack. Coury later worked as a guitarist and songwriter on several Don Henley and Randy Meisner albums. Stawinski worked a time in the prominent British power pop band Badfinger.

Members
 Doug Fieger – vocals, bass
 John Coury - guitar, keyboards, backing vocals
 Rob Stawinski – drums, backing vocals

Discography
 Don't Hold Back (1970)
 Sailor's Delight (1970)

See also
Music of Detroit
1970s in music

References 

American country music groups
Musical groups from Detroit